Good Hope Township is one of the eleven townships of Hocking County, Ohio, United States. As of the 2010 census the population was 1,399.

Geography
Located in the northwestern part of the county, it borders the following townships:
Berne Township, Fairfield County - north
Marion Township - northeast
Falls Township (southwestern portion) - southeast
Laurel Township - south
Perry Township - southwest
Madison Township, Fairfield County - west

No municipalities are located in Good Hope Township, although the unincorporated community of Rockbridge lies in the northern part of the township.

Name and history
Good Hope Township was likely named after the former Our Lady of Good Hope Catholic church.

It is the only Good Hope Township statewide.

Government
The township is governed by a three-member board of trustees, who are elected in November of odd-numbered years to a four-year term beginning on the following January 1. Two are elected in the year after the presidential election and one is elected in the year before it. There is also an elected township fiscal officer, who serves a four-year term beginning on April 1 of the year after the election, which is held in November of the year before the presidential election. Vacancies in the fiscal officership or on the board of trustees are filled by the remaining trustees.

References

External links
County website

Townships in Hocking County, Ohio
Townships in Ohio